Carril is a surname. Notable people with the name include:

Dani Carril (born 1980), Spanish footballer
Esteban Carril (born 1977), Spanish tennis player and coach
Iván Carril (born 1985), Spanish footballer
Jonathan Carril (born 1984), Spanish footballer
Pete Carril (1930–2022), American basketball coach
Vicente López Carril (1942–1980), Spanish road racing cyclist

See also
Caril, given name
Carrel, surname
Carrol, given name and surname
Del Carril, surname